Ramsey Heights Nature Reserve is a small nature reserve near the village of Ramsey Heights in Cambridgeshire, England.

It is managed by the Wildlife Trust for Bedfordshire, Cambridgeshire, Northamptonshire and Peterborough.

The Wildlife Trust Countryside Centre in the reserve is based in a converted Victorian brickworks. It provides educational events for families.

References 

Nature reserves in Cambridgeshire
Wildlife Trust for Bedfordshire, Cambridgeshire and Northamptonshire reserves
Ramsey, Cambridgeshire